Cass Township is an inactive township in Greene County, in the U.S. state of Missouri.

Cass Township has the name of politician Lewis Cass.

References

Townships in Missouri
Townships in Greene County, Missouri